Ishmekeyevo (İşmäkäy) is a rural locality (a village) in Urazovsky Selsoviet, Uchalinsky District, Bashkortostan, Russia. The population was 251 as of 2010. There are 5 streets.

Geography 
Ishmekeyevo is located 32 km southwest of Uchaly (the district's administrative centre) by road. Bazargulovo is the nearest rural locality.

References 

Rural localities in Uchalinsky District